The 2016 Southeast Missouri State Redhawks football team represented Southeast Missouri State University as a member of the Ohio Valley Conference (OVC) during the 2016 NCAA Division I FCS football season. Led by third-year head coach Tom Matukewicz, the Redhawks compiled an overall record of 3–8 with a mark of 3–5 in conference play, placing seventh in the OVC. Southeast Missouri State played home games at Houck Stadium in Cape Girardeau, Missouri.

Schedule

Game summaries

at Memphis

at Southern Illinois

Indiana State

at Murray State

Eastern Illinois

at Eastern Kentucky

at Tennessee Tech

Austin Peay

Jacksonville State

at Tennessee–Martin

Tennessee State

References

Southeast Missouri State
Southeast Missouri State Redhawks football seasons
Southeast Missouri State Redhawks football